The 2023 World Series of Poker will be the 54th edition of the World Series of Poker (WSOP), a series of poker tournaments. It will take place from May 30-July 18 at the Horseshoe Las Vegas and Paris Las Vegas in Las Vegas, Nevada.

The series will feature 95 bracelet events, plus another 20 online bracelet events. Events include the $1,000 Mystery Millions beginning on May 31, with mystery bounties of up to $1 million. There will also be Badugi and Big O events for the first time, as well as a $300 Gladiators of Poker event. The Tournament of Champions also returns, this time near the beginning of the series.

The $10,000 Main Event will begin on July 3 with the first of four starting flights. The final table will be held over two days on July 16-17.

Event Schedule

Online Events

Michigan Online
7 events

Pennsylvania Online
7 events

References

External links
Official website

World Series of Poker
World Series of Poker
World Series of Poker
Poker